PC/TCP Packet Driver is a networking API for MS-DOS, PC DOS, and later x86 DOS implementations such as DR-DOS, FreeDOS, etc. It implements the lowest levels of a TCP/IP stack, where the remainder is typically implemented either by terminate-and-stay-resident drivers or as a library linked into an application program. It was invented in 1983 at MIT's Lab for Computer Science (CSR/CSC group under Jerry Saltzer and David D. Clark), and was commercialized in 1986 by FTP Software.

A packet driver uses an x86 interrupt number (INT) between  The number used is detected at runtime, it is most commonly 60h but may be changed to avoid application programs which use fixed interrupts for internal communications. The interrupt vector is used as a pointer (4-bytes little endian) to the address of a possible interrupt handler.  If the null-terminated ASCII text string "PKT  DRVR" (2 spaces in the middle!) is found within the first 12-bytes -- more specifically in bytes 3 through 11 -- immediately following the entry point then a driver has been located.

Packet drivers can implement many different network interfaces, including Ethernet, Token Ring, RS-232, Arcnet, and X.25.

Functions

Drivers 

WinPKT is a driver that enables use of packet drivers under Microsoft Windows that moves around applications in memory.

W3C507 is a DLL to packet driver for the Microsoft Windows environment.

See also 
 Crynwr Collection - alternative free packet driver collection
 Network Driver Interface Specification (NDIS) - developed by Microsoft and 3Com, free wrappers
 Open Data-Link Interface (ODI) - developed by Apple and Novell
 Universal Network Device Interface (UNDI) - used by Intel PXE
 Uniform Driver Interface (UDI) - defunct
 Preboot Execution Environment - network boot by Intel, widespread

References 

Computer networks
Device drivers